PixelJunk Shooter 2 is a multidirectional shooter developed by Q-Games for the PlayStation 3. It is the sequel to PixelJunk Shooter and was released on the PlayStation Store in March 2011. PixelJunk Shooter 2 was formally announced by Q-Games on 18 May 2010. The title is the first sequel to any PixelJunk game.

PixelJunk Shooter Ultimate, developed by Double Eleven, combines both games into one continuous game. It was released on PlayStation 4 and PlayStation Vita in June 2014 and for Microsoft Windows in October 2015.

Reception

PixelJunk Shooter 2 received "favourable" reviews according to the review aggregation website Metacritic.

References

External links
 PixelJunk Shooter 2's Official website
 

2011 video games
Cooperative video games
Multidirectional shooters
PlayStation 3 games
PlayStation 4 games
PlayStation Vita games
PlayStation Network games
Sony Interactive Entertainment games
Windows games
Video games developed in Japan
Multiplayer and single-player video games
Q-Games games